Raith Rovers competed in the Scottish First Division, Scottish Cup, Scottish League Cup, Scottish Challenge Cup & the Fife Cup during the 2009–10 season.

Results and fixtures
*Note: Musselburgh Athletic, Cupar Hearts, Tynecastle, Civil Service Strollers & Whitehill Welfare friendlies were a Raith XI.

League table

References

Raith Rovers F.C. seasons
Rangers